Mere Meherbaan (English: My Saviour)  is a 2014 Pakistani romantic drama serial that aired on Hum TV every Monday at 8:00 pm PKT. It was directed by award-winning director Farooq Rind, written by Maha Malik and produced by 7th Sky Entertainment. It stars Ayeza Khan, Neelam Muneer, Sanam Chaudhry, and Madiha Rizvi in pivotal roles. The show concluded its final, 28th episode on 17 November 2014.

Synopsis
Mere Meherban is a story of two women and their daughters; Shaista and Nayyara. Shaista is selfish and has ruined her husband's life. Shaista's daughters, Muskaan and Iraj are stylish and are rude and aggressive, especially toward their cousins.

Nayyara is Shaista's cousin and married Shaista's brother-in-law. She is happy and middle-class. Meanwhile, Nayyara's daughters, Fala and Haya are respectful.

Plot
The story starts with Muskan, who is soon to be engaged. She has a younger sister, Iraj. Muskan and Iraj always quarrel with each other because they are rich and wealthy girls who have no manners or no respect, but they love their mother, Shaista, and their mother loves them, too. They have an elder brother Zeeshan, he hates both his sisters but loves their attitude. The mother and the daughters hate their father's brother Baseer and his family because they are more richer then them. His family consists of him, his wife Nayyara and three daughters Fala, Haya and Fariya. They all are well-mannered. Shaista always insults Nayyara and treats her daughters as Foe. Muskaan goes to her aunt Nayyara's Mansion, where she asks Fala to do her pedicure and manicure as Fala had done many parlour courses but fala and her nayyara taunt and say foul words to muskan and kick her out of the Mansion. Muskan returns to her villa and tells her mother everything hearing this her mother gets furious and goes to nayyara's Mansion and tells her how dare she did to her daughter. Nayyara slaps on Shaista' face and tells her to shut up and reminds her if her past and says you forgot your past that your husband loved me but you came in between,hearing this shaista runs away from their. Muskan taunts shaista you are a dumb mother that is scared of her sister in law.
Muskaan's father Nazir comes from New York with many precious things for her daughters and wife, but Zeeshan is fine with it. Iraj likes a bottle of perfume because of which Muskaan is jealous and they start fighting, breaking of perfume bottle. But their mother Shaista is busy looking in things. Love is the only emotion between Nayyara's daughters while Iraj and Muskaan are always fighting. Nazir goes to Nayyara's Mansion and it is later revealed that he used to love Nayyara in his younger days. It was Shaista who had come between them. Nayyara used to like Nazir, but Nayyara respects him now. He gives 400000 to each of her daughters out of love, and Iraj sees this. The next day during the engagement, Iraj starts insulting Nayyara's daughters. Nayyara slaps on iraj's face and insults her in front of the guests.Nazir beats iraj with stick until she faints and stops her pocket money. Danish's aunt Naima visits Fala and starts liking her. She is interrupted by Shaista, and she asks for a family photo. Naima tells Fala to come, but Shaista insults Fala. Nayyara comes to Nazir and starts crying Nazir hugs her and asks what happened dear, Nayyara tells her that the wicked Shaista insulted her daughter fala hearing this nazir goes to his villa in furious. Nazir slaps shaista and warns her if next time if she ever dared to say anything to nayyara and her daughters he will kick Shaista out of his villa. Shaista and her daughters get angry.

The next day, Iraj is talking very loudly on her phone in Muskaan's room. Muskaan receives a call from Daanish, her fiance at the same time. Because of Iraj's voice, Muskaan cuts the phone, and then later Iraj climbs on Muskaan, and they start fighting. Their father comes and stats beating them both with his stick and kicks in muskan's stomach and slaps on iraj's face various times. Shaista comes between and he starts beating her, Zeeshan stops his father and says what the hell you are doing here, Nazir warns the sisters and shaista if next time they fight in his house he would burn them alive.

The next day, Naima goes to Nayyara's Mansion. Nayyara accepts her proposal of Ayaan for Fala. Zeeshan expresses his feelings for Haya towards Nazir. Nazir is very happy because Nazir greedy and wants some wealth from Baseer since Baseer is 20 times more rich then Nazir. Nazir says this to Baseer. Baseer is very excited. But Nayyara is not so happy because she thinks Haya will be sad at that home but later agrees. But Shaista refuses to do this. She hates Haya and says that she will never ever be her daughter-in-law. She thinks that Nayyara is taking revenge on Shaista of yesteryear's fight, which had happened between them during their young days over Nazir . But Nazir does not agree with Shaista, and he is happy with Haya's and Zeeshan's marriage.

Later, two engagements take place simultaneously. One is of Haya and Zeeshan, and the other is of Fala and Ayaan. Iraj, Muskaan and Shaista are unhappy. Danish and his family visit Muskaan to decide the date of marriage. There Muskaan says to Danish that neither she is going to work nor wear suits. She will wear only modern clothes. Now Muskaan and Fala are married. Muskaan has a sweet mother-in-law, but she hates her. Haya's mother-in-law is not at all kind towards her. Fala's mother-in-law and husband Ayaan are kind towards her but had hidden from her that Ayaan has a son, Sulaiman. Fala is shocked, she feels her self-esteem broken down all of a sudden. She returns to her Mother's house for a while but later comes to the terms due to her spiritual and excellent upbringing and returns to her in-laws side and accepts her husband's son.

Now all of a sudden, Iraj creates a false story of her friend's birthday party and meanwhile marries her love Shehryar. She takes her and Sabrina's jewellery for him. Now the blame for jewellery goes on Haya, and Shaista creates a ruckus. Zeeshan doesn't even utter a word to support Haya. She throws her out of the house. Haya is broken by this and she undergoes a very mental and health breakdown. Seeing her vulnerable condition and her broken self-esteem her mother, Nayyara calls off the engagement. He is later married to Sabrina by her mother. Meanwhile, Muskaan is showing her true colours in her in-laws house. She does not listen to Danish and once when her mother-in-law wants to go for a Get Together party, she ridicules her, saying that despite her age, she wants to party. She insults her mother-in-law.

Fala and Ayaan are happy with each other. But Sulaiman's mother and Ayaan's ex-wife Mariya comes to meet Sulaiman. Naima puts forth a condition that if she wants to meet her son, she has to take him forever. Ayaan and Fala are against it, but they have to accept it.

Nazir Hussain has a fatal heart attack in Dubai and is his body is bought to Pakistan by Wali Ahmed, who previously lived with him in Dubai. His death brings Nayyara's family and Shaistha, Iraj and Zeeshan together but not Muskaan her behaviour remains the same. 
 
Iraj is now married to Wahaj, a successful, rich businessman. Nobody knows the truth of her marriage to Wahaj but only her. She starts feeling insecure about her marriage to Wahaj and returns to her mother's house. She questions her existence and is mentally disturbed because Shehryaar never returned. Later it is discovered by her and Nayyara and Shehryaar died while illegally entering other country. She is heartbroken. Iraj comes back and tells the truth about the jewellery. Muskaan is surprised to learn that her husband has remarried. She comes to her house.

Iraj starts liking Wahaj and returns to her in-laws house when he comes to take her back. Shaista and Sabrina have become enemies and Sabrina leaves Zeeshan. Now Shaista's and her children's life has become a living hell. Haya is going to be remarried to her cousin. Zeeshan asks for forgiveness and reacceptance, but Haya refuses. Hopes start rising for Iraj when Wahaj comes to takes her back. She goes with him. Meanwhile, Shaista goes with Muskaan and Zeeshan in Nayyara's house to talk about Haya. She sees that Haya's rishta is fixed. Shaista is in a complete shock. Muskaan's mother-in-law comes to take her, but she insults her by saying that she's doing a melodrama. She calls Danish and says, "I will come only if you leave your second wife and come to pick her up". He refuses. So, in anger she requests a divorce. He gives her the divorce papers. She is shocked.

Fala and Ayaan are living happily. Zeeshan leaves the house. Shaista goes into a deeper shock. Now Nayyara invites Muskaan and Shaista to come for Haya's marriage. They come. The show ends with Shaista hugging Haya, and Shaista remembers how she had told Nazir that she would not make Haya Zeeshan's wife. Shaista feels guilty.

Cast
 Ayeza Khan as Haya Baseer 
 Neelam Muneer as Muskaan Nazir
 Sanam Chaudhry as Iraj Nazir 
 Madiha Rizvi as Fala Baseer
 Agha Ali as Zeeshan Nazir 
 Humayun Ashraf as Danish 
 Hassan Niazi as Ayaan
 Ahsan Balaj as Wahaj 
 Tipu Sharif as Waleed Ahmed 
 Rabia Noreen as Shaista Nazir
 Seemi Pasha as Naima 
 Ismat Zaidi as Nayyara Baseer
 Minal Khan as Fariya Baseer 
 Mehmood Akhtar as Baseer Hussain 
 Mohsin Gillani as Nazir Hussain
 Imran Ashraf as Shehryar (Sherry) 
 Nausheen Ahmed Hasan as Sabrina Zeeshan
 Mizna Waqas as Wahaj's sister
 Ayesha Toor as Maria

Soundtrack
Mere Meherbaan OST is sung by Rahat Fateh Ali Khan.

Accolades
The drama received the following nominations at the 2015 Hum Awards:

References

External links
 
 
 Hum TV's Mere Meherbaan official page

2014 Pakistani television series debuts
2014 Pakistani television series endings
7th Sky Entertainment
Hum Network Limited
Hum TV
Hum TV original programming
Pakistani drama television series
Pakistani telenovelas
Serial drama television series
Urdu-language television shows